The Air Seller (rus. Продавец воздуха) is a science fiction novel by Russian writer Alexander Belayev. It was first published in 1929, in several issues of Vokrug Sveta magazine. The first book edition was in 1956.

Plot
Meteorologist Georgiy Klimenko and his Yakut guide Nikola are investigating a strange wind anomaly in Yakutia, Eastern Siberia, when they are caught prisoner by a megalomaniac villain Bayley. With a gigantic air-sucking device, built by Swedish scientist Engelbrecht, Bayley is slowly stealing the Earth's atmosphere. The deeply frozen oxygen is stored in a vast cryogenic warehouse. Bayley plans to create oxygen deficit and then to start selling fresh air, thus eventually becoming the master of the world. He even boasts of having trade relations with Martians, though the credibility of this claim is left unclear. Klimenko soon discovers, however, that Bayley is not the one who pulls the strings, but there are wealthy and influential Western imperialists behind the plot.

Engelbrecht's daughter Nora is sympathetic to the prisoners. She helps Nikola to escape and warn the Soviets of the danger. However, the Red Army is unable to assault Bayley's base directly, since that would risk an explosive vaporization of the frozen air (Bayley demonstrates the possible consequences by releasing a portion of said air, leveling enormous areas of Siberia and the Europe.). Bayley holds Nora hostage in order to keep Engelbrecht under control. Realising the danger Bayley's plans impose to the Earth, Nora commits suicide by exposing herself to the frozen oxygen. Now free and lusting for revenge, Engelbert sides with Klimenko. The base is finally stormed by the Red Army, shown a safe passage in by the escaped Nikola. Bayley, facing imminent capture, swallows some frozen air balls and explodes.

Film adaptation

The novel was adapted into film in 1967 by Odessa Film Studio and director Vladimir Ryabtsev, with Artyom Karapetian as Bayley and Gennady Nilov as Klimenko.

References

External links 
 Александр Беляев. Продавец воздуха (public domain since 2017) 

1929 science fiction novels
Soviet science fiction novels
Novels by Alexander Beliaev
20th-century Russian novels
Russian novels adapted into films